The 1924–25 League of Ireland was the fourth season of top-tier football in the Republic of Ireland. It began on 6 September 1924 and ended on 25 April 1925.

Bohemians were the defending champions.

Changes from 1923–24
Two teams withdrew from the League: Midland Athletic were not re-elected while Shelbourne United withdrew on 7 September 1924, the day after the season began.

Two teams were elected: Bray Unknowns and Fordsons, from Cork the latter being the first team from Munster to compete in the League.

Season overview 
Both matches involving Athlone Town and Bohemians were not played, with both matches awarded as wins to Bohemians.

Shamrock Rovers won their second title.

Teams

Table

Results

Top goalscorers

Source:

See also
1924–25 FAI Cup

References

Ireland
League Of Ireland, 1924-25
League of Ireland seasons